Asian Highway 11 (AH11) is a road in the Asian Highway Network running 1567 km from Vientiane, Laos to Sihanoukville, Cambodia connecting AH12 to AH1 and continuing to Gulf of Thailand. This international highway connects capitals of Laos and Cambodia.

Laos

Cambodia

  Highway 7: Dong Calor - Skuon.
  Highway 6: Skuon - Phnom Penh
  Highway 4: Phnom Penh - Sihanoukville

Junctions
Laos
  Vientiane
  Ban Lao
  Thakhek
  Seno
Cambodia
  near Harbin

See also
 List of Asian Highways

References

External links
  Treaty on Asian Highways with routes

Asian Highway Network
Roads in Cambodia
Roads in Laos